Love Live Long is a 2008 experimental film centred on the Gumball 3000 rally.

External links
 

2008 films
Films directed by Mike Figgis
2008 drama films
British drama films
2000s English-language films
2000s British films